Tap City, the New York City Tap Festival, was launched in 2001 in New York City. Held annually for approximately one week each summer, the festival features tap dancing classes, choreography residencies, panels, screenings, and performances as well as awards ceremonies, concert performances, and Tap it Out, a free, public, outdoor event performed in Times Square by a chorus of dancers. The goal of the Festival is to establish a "higher level of understanding and examination of tap’s storied history and development.”

History
Tap City was designed to bring attention to New York City’s tap community. Its first iteration was held from July 7 through July 15, 2001, at various studios and performance spaces around Manhattan. Chaired by Hoagy Carmichael Jr., and Gregory Hines, the Festival began with an open jam session at the Broadway Dance Center in midtown Manhattan. Over the ensuing eight days, an international roster of over 90 performers appeared, which according to the New York Times, writing the day before the event, was to include "well-known tapsters like Jimmy Slyde, Prince Spender of the Four Step Brothers, Brenda Bufalino, Jane Goldberg, Lynn Dally, the Silver Belles and Gregory Hines. Many of the performers will also teach classes."

Venues over the years have included The Joyce Theater, the Duke on 42nd Street, Symphony Space, Chelsea Studios, the Hudson River for a waterborne tap jam, and the amphitheater at the Fashion Institute of Technology.

Festival highlights
Highlights of the festival now include:

Tap Awards
Film presentations and performances honor recipients of the Hoofer and Tap Preservation Awards and inductees into the International Tap Dance Hall of Fame.

International Tap Dance Hall of Fame
2002
 Fred Astaire  
 Jeni Le Gon  
 Baby Laurence Jackson
 Bill 'Bojangles' Robinson  
 Eleanor Powell  
 John W. Bubbles  
 Steve Condos  
 The Nicholas Brothers 
2003
 Charles 'Honi' Coles  
 Chuck Green 
2004
 Ann Miller  
 Donald O'Connor  
 Gregory Hines 
2005
 Peg Leg Bates
 Sammy Davis Jr.
2006
 Bunny Briggs 
2007
 Eddie Brown 
 Leon Collins 
2008
 Jimmy Slyde  
 Mable Lee  
 Two-Man Comedy Tap Team - Cook & Brown
 Two-Man Comedy Tap Team - Stump and Stumpy 
2009
 Brenda Bufalino  
 The Class Act 
2010
 Maurice Hines 
2011
 Charles "Cholly" Atkins 
2012
 Alice Whitman and the Whitman Sisters' Legacy 
2013
 James Buster Brown
 Paul Draper 
2014
 Carnell Lyons 
 Gene Kelly 
2015
 Henry LeTang  
 Ray Bolger
2016
 Harriet "Quicksand" Browne
 Master Juba
 Original Copasetics
 Ludie Jones
 The Apollo "Number One" Chorus Line
2017
 Duke Ellington
 The Cotton Club Girls and the Cotton Club Boys
2018
 Ralph Brown
 Tap Happenings
2019
 Ruby Keeler
 The Radio City Music Hall Rockettes
 Dianne Walker
2020
 Arthur Duncan
 The June Taylor Dancers
2021
 Paul and Arlene Kennedy
 Hal Le Roy

Annual Copacetic Boat Ride
The Festival officially kicks off every year on the Circle Line with performances and a tap jam accompanied by a live jazz band.

“Main stage” concert performances
The festival includes at least one Mainstage event. Recent iterations include Tap Forward, which featured new work created and performed by soloists, contemporary tap ensembles, new talent and so-called "tap dance masters.”

Tap it Out
The festival finale, which features hundreds of tappers dancing in tandem in a free public, outdoors event.

References

External links 
 Tap City - A New York Celebration of Tap Dance This July, Huffington Post, by Adria Rolnick. August 2013
 New York City Tap Festival, The New Yorker. July 2013

Festivals in New York City
Dance festivals in the United States
Festivals established in 2001
Tap dance